Toxorhina magna is a species of limoniid crane fly in the family Limoniidae. This species can be found on the East Coast of the United States as far west as Michigan and as far south as Florida. Its yellowish brown color its most obvious difference from the grayish Toxorhina muliebris which is found in the northern parts of T. magna's range.

References

Limoniidae
Articles created by Qbugbot
Insects described in 1865